Ellam Chettante Ishtam Pole  is a 2015 Indian Malayalam-language film directed by Haridas, featuring Manikandan Pattambi, Charulatha, Sasi Kalinga and Sunil Sugatha, It was produced by Dr Sudhakaran Nair and scripted by Haneefa Ambadi.

Cast
 Manikandan Pattambi as Govindhan Kutty
 Sunil sukhadha as Veluthambi
 Kalinga Sasi
 Balachandran Chullikkadu
 Siddharth Shiva
 E.A Rajendran
 Hareesh Perumanna
 Master Vivas
 Vijyan Karanthoor
 Charulatha
 Sona Heiden
 Lakshmi Sharma
 Soniya
 Yamini Bhaskar 
 Manka Mahesh
 Manju
 Sandra Shekhar
 Manjusha Sajish

References

https://www.imdb.com/title/tt4384386/reference

2010s Malayalam-language films